In geometry, the Pappus chain is a ring of circles between two tangent circles investigated by Pappus of Alexandria in the 3rd century AD.

Construction
The arbelos is defined by two circles, CU and CV, which are tangent at the point A and where CU is enclosed by CV.  Let the radii of these two circles be denoted as rU and rV, respectively, and let their respective centers be the points U and V.  The Pappus chain consists of the circles in the shaded grey region, which are externally tangent to CU (the inner circle) and internally tangent to CV (the outer circle).  Let the radius, diameter and center point of the nth circle of the Pappus chain be denoted as rn, dn and Pn, respectively.

Properties

Centers of the circles

Ellipse
All the centers of the circles in the Pappus chain are located on a common ellipse, for the following reason.  The sum of the distances from the nth circle of the Pappus chain to the two centers U and V of the arbelos circles equals a constant

Thus, the foci of this ellipse are U and V, the centers of the two circles that define the arbelos; these points correspond to the midpoints of the line segments AB and AC, respectively.

Coordinates
If r = AC/AB, then the center of the nth circle in the chain is:

Radii of the circles
If r = AC/AB, then the radius of the nth circle in the chain is:

Circle inversion

The height hn of the center of the nth circle above the base diameter ACB equals n times dn.  This may be shown by inverting in a circle centered on the tangent point A.  The circle of inversion is chosen to intersect the nth circle perpendicularly, so that the nth circle is transformed into itself.  The two arbelos circles, CU and CV, are transformed into parallel lines tangent to and sandwiching the nth circle; hence, the other circles of the Pappus chain are transformed into similarly sandwiched circles of the same diameter. The initial circle C0 and the final circle Cn each contribute ½dn to the height hn, whereas the circles C1–Cn−1 each contribute dn.  Adding these contributions together yields the equation hn = n dn.

The same inversion can be used to show that the points where the circles of the Pappus chain are tangent to one another lie on a common circle.  As noted above, the inversion centered at point A transforms the arbelos circles CU and CV into two parallel lines, and the circles of the Pappus chain into a stack of equally sized circles sandwiched between the two parallel lines.  Hence, the points of tangency between the transformed circles lie on a line midway between the two parallel lines.  Undoing the inversion in the circle, this line of tangent points is transformed back into a circle.

Steiner chain
In these properties of having centers on an ellipse and tangencies on a circle, the Pappus chain is analogous to the Steiner chain, in which finitely many circles are tangent to two circles.

References

Bibliography

External links

Arbelos
Inversive geometry
Circle packing